The World Scrabble Championship 1995 was the third World Scrabble Championship. The winner was David Boys of Canada.

A fifteen round, Swiss-paired preliminary event was used to determine initial placement. The top four players then played a three-game round-robin (with the results of the first 15 games carrying over) to determine the finalists, who played a best-of-five final.

The first game of the finals was a close one with Sherman winning 431–421. Sherman missed a bingo (pENTROOF) but at that point, the game was already in the bag.

In the second game, many felt that Sherman blundered in his opening play while Boys cruised to an easy 404–278 victory despite missing ABOmASA early on.

Sherman and Boys traded wins again in games three and four, setting up a single game to decide the championship.

The final game was a bit of an anti-climax with Boys winning easily 432–300 (after challenging off Sherman's early phony TWINNERS) to take the World Championship. With two tiles in the bag, Boys chose to bypass a 98-point bingo (LADYBUGS) to block a triple-triple line that Sherman had a 1-in-18 chance of using for the game-winning 212-point PEJORATE. The blocking play left Sherman with no chance to win and left Boys as World Champion.

Complete results

FINALS:
Game 1: Sherman 431 – Boys 421
Game 2: Boys 404 – Sherman 278
Game 3: Sherman 443 – Boys 398
Game 4: Boys 495 – Sherman 393
Game 5: Boys 432 – Sherman 300

References

External links 
Report from 1995 WSC, Day 1
Report from 1995 WSC, Day 2
Report from 1995 WSC, Day 3
Report from 1995 WSC, Day 4

1995
1995 in British sport
1995 in London
Scrabble in the United Kingdom